Juan de Iriarte (15 December 1701 - 23 August 1771) was a Spanish writer, French and English translator in the Royal Chancery, Hellenist and latinist.

Biography
Born at Puerto de la Orotava, now Puerto de la Cruz, Canary Islands), he was educated in Paris in 1713 with one of his students being Voltaire.  He moved to London and completed a formation for his native island.  He later moved to Madrid where he was officially nominated at Biblioteca Real.  Aged 28, he edited Regia Matritensis Bibliotheca in 1729, his first catalog published on the contents of  the Biblioteca Real.  The Bibliotecario Mayor of the institution, Juan de Ferras, managed to get him appointed as a private tutor of the families of the Duque de Béjar, the Duque de Alba and Royal Prince Manuel de Portugal.

He was sent to be educated in France and later to England  through the company of Monsieur Hely, former Consul of France in the Canary Islands. He was the uncle of the poet and theatrical writer Tomás de Iriarte y Nieves Ravelo.

Juan de Iriarte wrote Gramática latina (Latin Grammar), he was created a convenient official nominator for the first Secretary of State.  He also wrote in Diario de los Literatos (1737) and in 1741 was elected member of the Real Academia Española of Languages,. he entered also at the Academia de Bellas Artes de San Fernando.

Iriarte also wrote Sobre la imperfección de los diccionarios. and Paleografía griega (Greek Paleography) as well as Bibliotheca graeca (Greek Library) in which he described Greek manuscripts.  His other works include Tauromaquia matritensis, sive taurorum ludi, (on Spanish bullfighting),  Lista de los Principales Manuscritos de la Librería de los Marqueses de Villena and Sacada de la Hijuela Authentica de los bienes que quedaron por muerte del Marqués Don Andrés Pacheco, en 9 de Octubre de 1748. Por la tarde por mí mismo, it was conserved at the Biblioteca de la Fundación Juan March.

Works
Obras sueltas de don Juan de Iriarte, Madrid, 1774, dos vols.
Regia Matritensis Bibliotheca (1729)
Sobre la imperfección de los diccionarios, discurso de ingreso en la Real Academia Española de la Lengua, 1747.
Colección de refranes castellanos traducidos en metros latinos, 1749.
Sobre los verbos reflexivos y recíprocos, 1756.
Advertencias sobre la sintaxis castellana, 1755.
Gramática latina, 1764.
Paleografía griega, 1760.
Bibliotheca graeca
Tauromaquia matritensis, sive taurorum ludi, Lista de los Principales Manuscritos de la Librería de los Marqueses de Villena. 1725.
''Lista de los Principales Manuscritos de la Librería de los Marqueses de Villena. Sacada de la Hijuela Authentica de los bienes que quedaron por muerte del Marqués Don Andrés Pacheco, en 9 de Octubre de 1748. Por la tarde por mí mismo.

References

External links
Waterloo Institute for Hellenistic Studies

1702 births
1770 deaths
Members of the Royal Spanish Academy
Iriate
Spanish male writers
Spanish Latinists
People from Puerto de la Cruz
Writers from the Canary Islands